The Red Carpet Handicap (known until 2013 as the Beverly Hills Handicap) is an American Thoroughbred horse race held annually (as of 2014) during Del Mar racetrack's fall meet which has been created to accommodate the overflow of established races from closing of Hollywood Park. The Grade III is run over a distance of  miles on turf, and is open to fillies and mares three years of age and older.

Originally the event was a Grade I race from 1988, then in 2003 The American Graded Stakes Committee of the Thoroughbred Owners and Breeders Association amended its status to a Grade II event. Since 2010 the event is a Grade IIIT.

Of note, is that Hall of Fame jockey Bill Shoemaker, who retired from riding in 1990, earned his first Grade I win as a trainer in the 1991 edition of the Beverly Hills Handicap with the filly, Alcando. 

Since the inaugural running in 1968, the  Beverly Hills Handicap has been contested at various distances:
  miles : 1968-1975, 2014-2019
  miles : 1976-1985, 1987-1995
  miles : 1986, 1996-2011

Records
Speed record: (at distance of  miles)
 1:58.56 - Astra (2002)

Most wins:
 2 - La Zanzara (1974, 1975)
 2 - Swingtime (1977, 1978)
 2 - Flawlessly  (1992, 1993)
 2 - Astra (2001, 2002)
 2 - Black Mamba (NZ) (2008, 2009)

Most wins by a jockey:
 6 - Chris McCarron (1979, 1989, 1992, 1993, 1995, 1996)

Most wins by a trainer:
 10 - Charlie Whittingham (1973, 1974, 1975, 1977, 1978, 1986, 1988, 1989, 1992, 1993)

Winners

*In 1990 there was a dead heat for first place.

Horse races in California
Del Mar Racetrack
Hollywood Park Racetrack
Graded stakes races in the United States
Middle distance horse races for fillies and mares
Turf races in the United States
Recurring sporting events established in 1968
1968 establishments in California